Wolfgang Frank (21 February 1951 – 7 September 2013) was a German football manager and player.

Frank was born in Reichenbach an der Fils, and made a total of 215 appearances in the Bundesliga during his playing career, scoring 89 goals. For the Germany national football B team, he scored three goals in six games.

As a manager, Frank was at the helm of 16 different clubs and led Rot-Weiss Essen to the 1994 DFB-Pokal final, only to lose 3–1 to SV Werder Bremen at Berlin's Olympic Stadium.

In his final year as a player, Frank trained as a teacher in sport and religion. He was inspired by Arrigo Sacchi's A.C.Milan and introduced the 4-4-2 system to Germany at a time when German teams played with a sweeper. Inspired by how Sacchi had got his team to press, marking space rather than individual players, Frank introduced this advanced tactical thinking into German football. He is credited with inspiring a renaissance in the Bundesliga which has inspired a new generation of managers such as Jürgen Klopp and Joachim Löw.

Frank died in Mainz, aged 62.

References

External links 
 

1951 births
2013 deaths
People from Esslingen (district)
Sportspeople from Stuttgart (region)
Footballers from Baden-Württemberg
German footballers
Association football forwards
West German expatriate footballers
Expatriate footballers in the Netherlands
Germany B international footballers
Bundesliga players
Eredivisie players
VfL Kirchheim/Teck players
VfB Stuttgart players
AZ Alkmaar players
Eintracht Braunschweig players
Borussia Dortmund players
1. FC Nürnberg players
German football managers
FC Aarau managers
FK Austria Wien managers
MSV Duisburg managers
SpVgg Unterhaching managers
FCV Farul Constanța managers
Kickers Offenbach managers
Wuppertaler SV managers
FC Carl Zeiss Jena managers
1. FSV Mainz 05 managers
Rot-Weiss Essen managers
2. Bundesliga managers
FC Winterthur managers
Deaths from cancer in Germany
3. Liga managers
West German expatriate sportspeople in the Netherlands
FC Wettingen managers
Expatriate football managers in Switzerland
German expatriate football managers
German expatriate sportspeople in Switzerland
FC Sachsen Leipzig managers
Expatriate football managers in Romania
German expatriate sportspeople in Romania
SV Wehen Wiesbaden managers
K.A.S. Eupen managers
Expatriate football managers in Belgium
German expatriate sportspeople in Belgium
West German footballers
West German expatriate sportspeople in Switzerland
West German football managers
West German expatriate football managers